Siruvallur, is a small neighbourhood of Perambur and a developed residential area in North Chennai, a metropolitan city in Tamil Nadu, India.

Location
Siruvallur is located near Agaram, Peravallur, Venus and Perambur. It is well connected by train and bus transport. It is very close to Perambur Carriage Works Railway Station.

References

Neighbourhoods in Chennai